The 2015 Middle Tennessee Blue Raiders football team represented Middle Tennessee State University as a member of the East Division of Conference USA (C-USA) during the 2015 NCAA Division I FBS football season. Led by tenth-year head coach Rick Stockstill, the Blue Raiders compiled an overall record of 7–6 with a mark of 6–2 in conference play, tying for second place in the C-USA's East Division. Middle Tennessee was invited to the Bahamas Bowl, where they lost to Western Michigan. The team played home games at Johnny "Red" Floyd Stadium in Murfreesboro, Tennessee.

Schedule
Middle Tennessee announced their 2015 football schedule on February 2, 2015. The 2015 schedule consisted of six home and six away games in the regular season.

Game summaries

Jackson State

at Alabama

Charlotte

at Illinois

Vanderbilt

at WKU

FIU

at Louisiana Tech

Marshall

at Florida Atlantic

North Texas

at UTSA

vs Western Michigan–Bahamas Bowl

References

Middle Tennessee
Middle Tennessee Blue Raiders football seasons
Middle Tennessee Blue Raiders football